Lianyun District is one of three urban districts of Lianyungang, Jiangsu province, China.

Administrative divisions
Lianyun District has 7 subdistricts, 1 town and 3 townships. 
7 subdistricts

1 town
 Chaoyang

3 townships
 Sucheng
 Gaogongdao
 Qiansandao

See also
 Lian Island

References 

www.xzqh.org

External links

County-level divisions of Jiangsu
Lianyungang